Dorcadion fuentei is a species of beetle in the family Cerambycidae. It was described by Pic in 1899. It is known from Spain.

See also 
Dorcadion

References

fuentei
Beetles described in 1899